The University of Fort Hare is a public university in Alice, Eastern Cape, South Africa.

It was a key institution of higher education for Africans from 1916 to 1959 when it offered a Western-style academic education to students from across sub-Saharan Africa, creating an African elite. Fort Hare alumni were part of many subsequent independence movements and governments of newly independent African countries.

In 1959, the university was subsumed by the apartheid system, but it is now part of South Africa's post-apartheid public higher education system. It is the alma mater of well-known people including Nelson Mandela, Desmond Tutu, Robert Sobukwe, Oliver Tambo, and others.

History

Originally, Fort Hare was a British fort in the wars between British settlers and the Xhosa of the 19th century. Some of the ruins of the fort are still visible today, as well as graves of some of the British soldiers who died while on duty there.

During the 1830s, the Lovedale Missionary Institute was built near Fort Hare. James Stewart, one of its missionary principals, suggested in 1878 that an institution for higher education of black students needed to be created. However, he did not live to see his idea put into operation when, in 1916, Fort Hare was established with Alexander Kerr as its first principal. D.D.T Jabavu was its first black staff member who lectured in Latin and African languages. In accord with its Christian principles, fees were low and heavily subsidised. Several scholarships were also available for indigent students.

Fort Hare had many associations over the years before it became a university in its own right. It was initially called the South African Native College or Fort Hare Native College and attached to the University of South Africa. It then became the University College of Fort Hare and associated with Rhodes University. With the introduction of apartheid, higher educational institutions in South Africa were strictly segregated along racial lines; blacks had previously gone to classes with Indians, coloureds and a few white students. From 1953 the school became part of the Bantu education system, and with the passage of the Promotion of Bantu Self Government Act in 1959, it was nationalized and segregated along racial and tribal lines, and teaching in African languages rather than English was encouraged. Fort Hare became a black university in its own right in 1970, strictly controlled by the state government.

It was a key institution in higher education for black Africans from 1916 to 1959. It offered a Western-style academic education to students from across sub-Saharan Africa, creating a black African elite. Fort Hare alumni were part of many subsequent independence movements and governments of newly independent African countries. Amongst those who studied at Fort Hare who later became leaders of their countries were Kenneth Kaunda, Seretse Khama, Yusuf Lule, Julius Nyerere, Robert Mugabe and Joshua Nkomo.

Leading opponents of the apartheid regime who attended included Nelson Mandela, Govan Mbeki and Oliver Tambo of the African National Congress, Mangosuthu Buthelezi of the Inkatha Freedom Party, Robert Sobukwe of the Pan Africanist Congress, and Desmond Tutu. Mandela, who studied Latin and physics there for almost two years in the 1940s, left the institution as a result of a conflict with a college leader. He later wrote in his autobiography: "For young black South Africans like myself, it was Oxford and Cambridge, Harvard and Yale, all rolled into one."

After the end of apartheid, Oliver Tambo became chancellor of the university in 1991. In 2005, the University of Fort Hare was awarded the Order of the Baobab in Gold for "Exceptional contribution to Black academic training and leadership development on the African continent."

University

The university's main campus is located in Alice near the Tyhume River. It is in the Eastern Cape Province about 50 km west of King William's Town, in a region that for a while was known as the "independent" state of Ciskei. In 2011, the Alice campus had some 6400 students. A second campus at the Eastern Cape provincial capital of Bhisho was built in 1990 and hosts a few hundred students, while the campus in East London, acquired through incorporation in 2004, has some 4300 students.

The university has five faculties (Education, Law, Management & Commerce, Science & Agriculture, Social Sciences & Humanities) all of which offer qualifications up to the doctoral level.

Strategic plans
Following a period of decline in the 1990s, Derrick Swarts was appointed vice-chancellor with the task of re-establishing the university on a sound footing.  The programme launched by Swarts was the UFH Strategic Plan 2000. The plan was meant to address the university's financial situation and academic quality standards simultaneously. The focus of the university was narrowed and consequently five faculties remained:
Education
Science and agriculture
Social sciences and humanities
Management and commerce
Law

Further narrowing the focus, 14 institutes were founded to deal with specific issues, such as the UNESCO Oliver Tambo Chair of Human Rights. Through their location the institutes have access to poor rural areas, and consequently emphasis is placed on the role of research in improving quality of life and economic growth (and especially sustainable job creation). Among the outreach programmes, the Telkom Centre of Excellence maintains a "living laboratory" of four schools at Dwesa on the Wild Coast, which have introduced computer labs and internet access to areas that until 2005 did not even have electricity. The projects at Dwesa focus research on Information and Communication for Development (ICD).

Incorporation of Rhodes University's former campus in East London in 2004 gave the university an urban base and a coastal base for the first time. Subsequent growth and development on this campus have been rapid. Initial developments of the new multi-campus university were guided by a three-year plan; currently the university is following the new "Strategic Plan 2009-2016", set to take the institution to its centennial year.

Notable alumni

See also

List of universities in South Africa

References

South African Native College Calendar, Thirteenth year, 1928. Fort Hare, Alice.

External links

Official website

 

 
Universities in the Eastern Cape
Educational institutions established in 1916
Public universities in South Africa
1916 establishments in South Africa
Raymond Mhlaba Local Municipality